Disabled homolog 2 is a protein that in humans is encoded by the DAB2 gene.

Function 

DAB2 mRNA is expressed in normal ovarian epithelial cells but is down-regulated or absent from ovarian carcinoma cell lines. The 770-amino acid predicted protein has an overall 83% identity with the mouse p96 protein, a putative mitogen-responsive phosphoprotein; homology is strongest in the amino-terminal end of the protein in a region corresponding to the phosphotyrosine interaction domain.  The down-regulation of DAB2 may play an important role in ovarian carcinogenesis. This gene was initially named DOC2 (for Differentially expressed in Ovarian Cancer) and is distinct from the DOC2A and DOC2B genes (for double C2-like domains, alpha and beta).

Interactions 

DAB2 has been shown to interact with:

 C-src tyrosine kinase, 
 Cdk1, 
 DAB2IP, 
 DVL2, 
 DVL3, 
 LRP2, 
 MYO6, 
 Mothers against decapentaplegic homolog 2,
 Mothers against decapentaplegic homolog 3 
 PIN1,  and
 Src.

References

Further reading